Liolaemus annectens is a species of lizard in the family  Liolaemidae. It is native to Argentina and Peru.

References

annectens
Reptiles described in 1901
Reptiles of Argentina
Reptiles of Peru
Taxa named by George Albert Boulenger